Chaenactis is a genus of plants in the daisy family which are known generally as pincushions or dustymaidens.

These wildflowers are native to western North America, especially the desert southwest of the United States. They are quite variable in appearance. They are generally aster-like in appearance with many disc florets in each head. There may be only disc florets, but sometimes there are also enlarged ray florets along the edges of the corolla. They may be white to yellow or pink.

Species
Species include:

References

External links
 Calflora Database: Chaenactis Taxon Report — with species links + images.
 Jepson Manual eFlora treatment of Chaenactis
 USDA Plants Profile for Chaenactis
 Southwest Colorado Wildflowers.com: photos of region's species
 

 
Asteraceae genera
Flora of Northwestern Mexico
Flora of the Western United States
Flora of California
Taxa named by Augustin Pyramus de Candolle